

The Aram Bagh is the oldest Mughal Garden in India, originally built by the Mughal Emperor Babur in 1528, located about five kilometers northeast of the Taj Mahal in Agra, India. Babur was temporarily buried there before being interred in Kabul.

The garden is a Persian garden, where pathways and canals divide the garden to represent the Islamic ideal of paradise, an abundant garden through which rivers flow. The Aram Bagh provides an example of a variant of the charbagh in which water cascades down three terraces in a sequence of cascades. Two viewing pavilions face the Jumna river and incorporates a subterranean 'tahkhana' which was used during the hot summers to provide relief for visitors. The garden has numerous water courses and fountains.

The name is a corruption of the Persian Aaram Bagh meaning 'Garden of Rest'. It is also variously known as Bagh-i Nur Afshan 'Light-Scattering Garden', Aalsi Bagh or 'Lazy Garden': according to legend, Emperor Akbar proposed to his third wife, who was a gardener there, by lying idle for 6 days until she agreed to marry him.

Jahangir waited in the garden in early March 1621 for the most astrologically auspicious hour for him to enter Agra after he took the Fort of Kangra. The preserved, surviving architecture dates to his reign and demonstrates the skill of his wife Nur Jahan as a garden designer.

In Art and Literature
An engraving of Thomas Shotter Boys' painting is in Fisher's Drawing Room Scrap Book, 1835, together with a poetical illustration (The history of Shah Dara's flight and death) by Letitia Elizabeth Landon entitled

Citations

References

Further reading

External links
The Herbert Offen Research Collection of the Phillips Library at the Peabody Essex Museum

Mughal gardens in India
Buildings and structures in Agra
Tourist attractions in Agra
Gardens in Uttar Pradesh
Persian gardens in India
Archaeological monuments in Uttar Pradesh
1528 in India